The National Football League (NFL) was the first professional association football league in South Africa, established in 1959. At first the NFL received stiff opposition from the SAFA, the amateur governing body which controlled the major football grounds in the county. The SAFA was a member of FIFA at the time.

Initially, only two areas of South Africa were represented - Transvaal and Durban - but gradually the league became more geographically representative. The teams that joined the league in 1959 were-Transvaal (9 teams)-Rangers, Germiston Callies, Arcadia Shepherds, Benoni United, Randfontein, Pretoria City, Brakpan United, Johannesburg City & Southern Park. Natal (3 teams)-Durban City, Durban United & Maritzburg Celtic. The League kicked-off on 4 July 1959 (only one round was played).

A promotion play-off for the Champions of the various State Leagues was introduced in 1962, and the league spread to Cape Town (1962), Bloemfontein (1963) and Port Elizabeth (1964). An NFL Division II was established in 1969, with the Champions promoted to Division I. The league was competitive during the apartheid era, and only white players were allowed to participate. However a few NFL teams traveled to neighboring countries to play friendlies.1961 Durban City beat a multi-racial Salisbury Combined XI 8-2 at the Glamis Stadium. An NFL XI lost to a Rhodesian XI 2-6, at the Raylton Sports ground. Germiston Callies played a non-white team, Black Pirates in Maseru, Lesotho. 25 February 1961.

However, black players did participate in the competition. The first to do so was Vincent Julius, he represented Arcadia Shepherds in 1976 versus Highlands Park. Highlands Park protested Julius' presence but the NFL allowed him to play. The South African Home Office took no action having been convinced by Arcadia Shepherds that the story would be told all around the world and cast the ruling party in a bad light.

When NFL folded after 18 years in 1977, it was superseded by a non-racial league. In practical terms, a merger happened between NFL (for whites) and NPSL (for blacks), to become the new common NPSL.

Winners

 Note that Addington were known as Durban Spurs when they won their second championship.
Source:

Individual Honours

Leading Aggregate Goalscorers

List of NFL Clubs (1959–1977)

List of 2nd Level Clubs (1969–1975)

Overseas teams that toured

1961. Leicester City, 1961 F.A.Cup finalists played Durban City on 27 May 1961, at Kingsmead. This was the first time that two professional teams from England and South Africa had played against one another. Leicester City won 2-0. Leicester City drew with Combined Transvaal 1-1, at the Rand Stadium.

1963. Tottenham Hotspur played three games in South Africa. 1st. 5 June 1963. V N.F.L XI @ Stamford Stadium, Durban. Won 5-2. 2nd. 8 June 1963 N.F.L XI @ Hartleyvale, Cape Town. Won 5-1. 3rd. 3 June 1963. V South Africa XI @ Rand Stadium. Won 3-1. The Spurs squad included Danny Blanchflower, Jimmy Greaves, Bobby Smith, Maurice Norman, Len White & Tony Marchi.

1963. Dundee United played three games in July 1963. V Transvaal, won 2-1. V Western Province, Hartleyvale.2 July. Lost 1-2. V Natal. Won 4-2.

1964. Arsenal played five games in May 1964. V Transvaal, Orange Free State won 2-0. 14th. V Natal. Durban Stadium. won 8-2. 17th. V Western Province. Won 5-1. V Eastern Province. Won 6-0. 22nd. V South Africa XI. won 5-0.

1964. Club Atletico Cerro (Uruguay). 14 July 1963. V Durban City. New Kingsmead.C.A.Cerro won 2-0. C.A.Cerro also played Western Province-17 July 1964 & South Africa XI, Rand Stadium. 20 July 1964.

1964. Real Madrid played three games in South Africa. 8 September 1964 V Castle Knights, Rand Stadium, winning 5-2. A N.F.L XI in Durban plus Western Province @ Hartleyvale, which Real Madrid won 4-0. The Real Madrid squad included Ferenc Puskas, Santamaria @ Gento. At this stage Real Madrid had won the European Cup on five consecutive occasions-1956, 1957, 1958, 1959 & 1960.

1964. Eintracht Frankfurt (Germany) played Addington, Highlands Park, Rand Stadium.

See also

 NFL Cup (association football)

References 

 
Defunct soccer leagues in South Africa
Soccer and apartheid
South